Lynn Pan ( born 1945 in Shanghai), also Ling Pan, is an author and an expert on the Overseas Chinese. She was born in Shanghai and studied at the University of London and Cambridge University. Her best-known book is Sons of the Yellow Emperor. Pan has lived in Kota Kinabalu (Malaysia), England, Geneva, Helsinki, Hong Kong and Singapore. She was the director of Chinese Heritage Centre in Singapore from 1995 to 1998.

Selected bibliography
In Search of Old Shanghai (1982), 
Old Shanghai: Gangsters in Paradise (1984), 
China's Sorrow: Journeys Around the Yellow River (1985),  (published in the U.S. as Into China's Heart: An Émigré's Journey Along the Yellow River)
The New Chinese Revolution (1987), 
Sons of the Yellow Emperor: The Story of the Overseas Chinese (1990),  (U.S.: Sons of the Yellow Emperor: A History of the Chinese Diaspora)
Tracing It Home: Journeys Around a Chinese Family (1992), 
True to Form: A Celebration of the Art of the Chinese Craftsman (2000),  
The Encyclopedia of the Chinese Overseas (1999),  (ed.)
Shanghai Style: Art and Design Between the Wars (2008),

External links
潘翎(Pan Lynn)
1995 interview at NewStory
Podcast of Lynn Pan discussing “Shanghai Style” at the Shanghai International Literary Festival
Shanghai, where West plus East made style

Living people
1945 births
Chinese sinologists
Chinese women writers
Writers from Shanghai
Women orientalists